Polycystididae is a family of flatworms belonging to the order Rhabdocoela.

Genera

Genera:
 Acrorhynchides Strand, 1928
 Acrorhynchus Graff, 1882
 Albertorhynchus Schockaert, 1976
 Gyratrix 	Ehrenberg, 1831

References

Platyhelminthes